The Beit El Yeshiva is a Religious Zionist Yeshiva situated in the Israeli settlement of Beit El, a community in the Binyamin region near Ramallah in the Israeli-controlled Area C of the West Bank.

History
The Yeshiva was founded in late 1977 by a group of students from the Mercaz haRav yeshiva in Jerusalem. The students originally lived on a nearby army base, but today the yeshiva has its own premises, and over 250 students enrolled. The rosh yeshiva (dean) is Rabbi Zalman Baruch Melamed.

Arutz Sheva - Israel National News was founded and is maintained by the Beit El Yeshiva. The Beit El Yeshiva also founded Yeshiva.co, a large Jewish website.

The Beit El Yeshiva Center also includes:
 A yeshiva (religious studies) high school for boys (junior and senior yeshiva high school), Yeshivat Bnei Zvi, also known as Bnei Zvi Yeshiva Ketana (pre-yeshiva high school; ketana stands for "small")
 An ulpana (religious studies) high school for girls, Ulpanat Ra'aya
 An ulpana high school for girls "with a wide variety of studies", Tal Ra'aya
 A mechina pre-military program for young men

References

Further reading

External links
Beit El Yeshiva Center Official Website 
 Bet El Kabbalists by Pinchas Giller, Encyclopedia of Jews in the Islamic World entry, p 5 sq

Religious Zionist yeshivot
Educational institutions established in 1977
Yeshivas in the West Bank
1977 establishments in the Israeli Military Governorate